Larbi Naji is a Moroccan professional footballer, who plays as a midfielder for AS FAR in Botola.

Honours
 Moroccan Throne Cup: 2018
 CAF Confederation Cup: 2020

References

External links

1990 births
Living people
People from Salé
Moroccan footballers
Association football midfielders
Botola players
Association Salé players
RS Berkane players
2020 African Nations Championship players
Morocco A' international footballers